The Nobu Hotel Barcelona, formerly the Gran Hotel Torre Catalunya, is a skyscraper and hotel in Barcelona, Catalonia, Spain. Completed in 1970, has 25 floors and rises 100 metres (including mast) and 80 metres without mast. It is located near Barcelona Sants Railway Station, Plaça d'Espanya and three other skyscrapers: Edificio Allianz, Edificio Tarragona, Torre Núñez y Navarro. It was renamed Nobu Hotel Barcelona in 2019, following a major renovation.

See also 

 List of tallest buildings and structures in Barcelona

External links 
 Nobu Hotel Barcelona official website

References 

Skyscraper hotels in Barcelona
Hotel buildings completed in 1970